Ultra Stereo is a cinema sound system that was developed in 1984 by chief engineer Jack Cashin.

It was a 4/2/4 photographic sound encoding and decoding procedure compatible with (and using the same technical basic structure, with identical sound quality as) its competitor Dolby Stereo Matrix.

Implementation
Four channels of information (Left, Center, Right and Surround) were matrix-encoded into two optical soundtracks on 35 mm theatrical release prints, occupying the same area of the film which previously held the monophonic soundtrack. The matrix-encoded track was decoded by the cinema processor in the theater during exhibition.

History
Ultra Stereo Labs (USL), which had been concentrating on the manufacture of sound equipment for studio screening rooms, was drawn into the exhibition-end of the business. The company developed a cinema processor, and over the next several years kept improving it and eventually placed the processor in theaters. Specifically, the USL cinema processor achieved greater channel separation than had been possible up to that time. Ultra Stereo Labs was awarded a Technical Achievement Award from the Academy of Motion Picture Arts and Sciences in 1984, for making improvements in film sound.

Soon after, USL also became involved in encoding movie soundtracks.  Since they had been manufacturing studio equipment for quite some time, people asked the company to develop encoding equipment for making print masters. Films encoded in Ultra Stereo can be also decoded on Dolby Cinema processors, as it was designed to be compatible with Dolby Stereo (using A-Type noise reduction) prints.

In October 2016, Ultra Stereo was acquired by QSC, LLC.

Later developments
The Ultra Stereo JS series model 105/195 unit introduced a six channel discrete input module (JFM-20 SR) circa 1993 which creates a THX approved 5.1 surround field. This is a line level input that can accept the output from a DVD player with 5.1 discrete channel outputs. The JS series eventually evolved into later models, including the JSD-80, JSD-100, and now the JSD-60.

When the industry moved away from analog soundtracks, USL transitioned to digital processing in all their audio products. In 2008, USL assembled a team of engineers to develop imaging technology for digital cinema. The result of this research and development was a leading edge digital cinema high frame rate media block and now an "all in one" media block with solid-state drives for storage. Ultra Stereo Labs continues to provide modern decoders, picture analyzers, and other devices for motion picture theaters.

Adoption
As of 2017, the Internet Movie Database lists 1,255 titles using this format. Unlike the Dolby process, however, using the Ultra Stereo process did not require licensing fees, reducing costs for filmmakers and studios.

References

Audiovisual introductions in 1985
Film sound production
Surround sound
Mass media companies